Felicia macrorrhiza is a small, evergreen shrub in the family Asteraceae. This species grows in the Karoo region of South Africa. It is called Aspoestertjie in Afrikaans.

It has narrow leaves, crowded on the younger stems, which leave a dry, persistent leaf base on older branches. The flower heads lack ray florets but contain many yellow disc florets.

Description
The branches are covered with gray brown bark and some long hairs. Older branches are densely set with persistent dry leaf bases, the younger ones with leaves.

The involucre is about 1 cm in diameter and consists of about four rows of lance-shaped, green, overlapping bracts, often with the margin tinged reddish, hardly papery and ciliate towards the tip. The flower heads never have ray florets. At the tip of both style branches is a triangular appendage. Around the base of the corolla are many yellowish white pappus bristles of two different lengths. The shorter pappus bristles are up to 1 mm long. The surface has few scales and long silky hairs, often with a narrow hairless zone bordering the edge.

Heads without ray florets also occur from time to time in related species of the section Lignofelicia, in particular F. whitehillensis, F. filifolia subsp. bodkinii and subsp. schaeferi.

Taxonomy
This species of daisy was first described in 1800 by Carl Thunberg, who named it Aster macrorrhizus. In 1836, Augustin Pyramus de Candolle assigned Thunberg's type to the genus Felicia, so creating Felicia macrorrhiza. He also described another collection in the same publication, which he called Fresenia scaposa. When Ernst Gottlieb von Steudel accepted De Candole’s name, a printing error was made, and the name Fresenia stuposa was published in 1840. In 1917, John Hutchinson distinguished Fresenia nana. In 1973, Jürke Grau considered all these names synonymous to Felicia macrorrhiza. The species is considered part of the section Lignofelicia.

Conservation
The continued survival of Felicia macrorrhiza is considered to be of least concern because its population is stable.

References

External links
 Line drawing of Felicia macrorrhiza
 Distribution map of Felicia macrorrhiza

macrorrhiza
Endemic flora of South Africa
Plants described in 1800